The 2006 United States Senate election in Maryland was held Tuesday, November 7, 2006. Incumbent Democrat Paul Sarbanes, Maryland's longest serving United States Senator, decided to retire instead of seeking a sixth term. Democratic nominee Ben Cardin, a U.S. Representative, won the open seat, defeating Republican Lieutenant Governor Michael Steele.

Democratic primary

Candidates

Declared 
 Benjamin L. Cardin, U.S. Representative
 David Dickerson, engineer
 George T. English, economist
 James H. Hutchison, psychiatrist
 Anthony Jaworski
 A. Robert Kaufman, social activist and perennial candidate
 Allan Lichtman, professor at American University
 Thomas McCaskill, physicist
 Kweisi Mfume, former U.S. Representative and former president of the NAACP
 Josh Rales, entrepreneur
 Dennis F. Rasmussen, former Baltimore County Executive
 Bob Robinson
 Theresa C. Scaldaferri
 Mike Schaefer, attorney
 Charles Ulysses Smith, activist
 Blaine Taylor, writer
 Joseph Werner, attorney
 Lih Young, perennial candidate

Withdrew 
 Lise Van Susteren, psychiatrist and sister of Greta Van Susteren

Declined 
 Chris Van Hollen, U.S. Representative

Campaign 
Kweisi Mfume, a former congressman and NAACP President, was the first to announce for the position, in March 2005. Ben Cardin, then a congressman since 1987, was the only other major candidate until September 2005, when Dennis F. Rasmussen, a former Baltimore County Executive, American University professor Allan Lichtman, and wealthy Potomac businessman Josh Rales entered the contest. Thirteen other candidates subsequently also entered the primary. As of August 2006, Cardin had raised more than $4.8 million and collected endorsements from a number of Democratic politicians, the AFL–CIO, and The Washington Post; Mfume had raised over $1.2 million and collected endorsements from the Maryland State Teachers Association, Progressive Maryland, former Maryland Governor Parris Glendening, the National Organization for Women, and Maryland Congressmen Elijah Cummings and Al Wynn.

On August 31, 2006, Maryland Public Television (MPT) and the League of Women Voters (LWV) sponsored a debate between the two leading Democratic Primary Candidates. The LWV of Maryland and MPT arbitrarily excluded most of the FEC qualified candidates from the only televised debates in the primary election. There were 18 candidates in this race, only 2, Ben Cardin and Kweisi Mfume, were allowed to debate, despite the strenuous protests of the excluded candidates. Lichtman, Rales, and Rasmussen petitioned MPT and LWV for inclusion in the debate, but received no response. On the day of the debate, Lichtman, his wife, and a campaign aide were arrested for trespassing while protesting during the taping of the debate. They were found not guilty on all charges. The judge in the case said it should never have been brought to court and was a gross violation of the parties' constitutional rights.

Debates 
Complete video of debate, August 31, 2006

Polling

Results

Republican primary

Candidates 
 Ray Bly, small businessman
 Earl S. Gordon
 Thomas J. Hampton, accountant
 John B. Kimble, behavioral researcher
 Edward Raymond Madej
 Daniel Muffoletto, small businessman
 Richard Shawver, activist
 Michael Steele, Lieutenant Governor and former Chairman of the Maryland Republican Party
 Corrogan R. Vaughn, perennial candidate
 Daniel "The Wig Man" Vovak, ghostwriter and owner of Greenwich Creations

Campaign 
Michael S. Steele was expected to win the Republican primary, and the Baltimore Sun wrote the month before that he faced "only nominal opposition". Among a field of nine other candidates, the only Republican receiving sufficient media coverage was Daniel Vovak.

Results

General election

Candidates 
 Michael S. Steele (R) – lieutenant governor
 Ben Cardin (D) – U.S. congressman
 Kevin Zeese (G) – (Campaign website). Zeese won the nominations of the Maryland Green Party, the Libertarian Party of Maryland, and the Populist Party of Maryland, the first time all three parties had nominated the same candidate. However, a Maryland law passed in April 2006 prohibited such fusion candidacies, so Zeese, who was a registered Green Party member, was listed on the ballot as only the Green Party candidate.

Campaign 
This was Maryland's first open Senate seat since 1986, when junior Senator Barbara Mikulski was first elected.

Michael Steele won the Republican nomination after facing little competition in the contest for the Republican ticket. With mostly unknown secondary candidates, Steele received 87% of the Republican Primary vote.

Third District Congressional Representative Ben Cardin won the Democratic Party nomination after facing tough competition in the contest for the Democratic ticket from former congressman and NAACP President Kweisi Mfume, businessman Josh Rales, former Baltimore County Executive Dennis F. Rasmussen, and several lesser known candidates. Cardin received 44% of the Democratic Primary vote to 40% for Mfume, his next closest competitor. All other candidates received percentages only in the single digits.

Kevin Zeese, the nominee for the Green, Populist and Libertarian Parties, was also on the ballot.

Though Steele lost the general election by 10% of the vote, a much wider margin than predicted, his was and remains the best showing for a Republican in a Senate race in Maryland since Charles Mathias, Jr. was reelected in 1980 with 66% of the vote.

Controversies 

Both Steele and Cardin made controversial statements and advertising throughout the campaign.

Debates 
The first debate of the race was held Tuesday, October 3, 2006. All three candidates were present and participated. The evening was hosted by the Baltimore Urban League, and moderated by Charles Robinson from Maryland Public Television and Doni Glover from BMORENEWS.

The first televised debate of the campaign was broadcast on News Channel 8 on the program "News Talk". All three candidates participated in the debate, and were moderated by Bruce DePuyt, the host of the program. There was no audience. This debate was widely reported because of the constant bickering between the three candidates, who often interrupted and talked over one another.

Another debate took place between Steele and Cardin on Sunday, October 29, 2006, as a part of the Meet The Press Senatorial debate series. Moderated by Tim Russert, the debate focused primarily on the Iraq War and stem-cell research, amongst other issues.

The three candidates all participated in the final debate of the campaign on Friday, November 3, 2006. The event was sponsored by the Collective Banking Group and held at the First Baptist Church of Glenarden.

Tactics 
Cardin primarily attacked Steele over his close relations with President Bush, including pictures of Bush and Steele in Cardin's TV ads.  Steele focused on low taxes, less government spending, free markets and national security.

Debates 
Complete video of debate, October 25, 2006
Complete video of debate, October 29, 2006

Predictions

Polling

Results 
Despite polls days before the election showing the race at a 3% margin, Cardin won by just over 10% with a 178,295-vote margin, although , this is the closest a Republican has come to winning a U.S. Senate election in Maryland since Charles Mathias was reelected in 1980. On the same day, incumbent Republican governor Bob Ehrlich lost reelection to Baltimore Mayor Martin O'Malley.

Results by county

Counties that flipped from Democrat to Republican
Allegany
Anne Arundel
Calvert
Cecil
Dorchester
Kent
Somerset
St. Mary's
Wicomico
Worcester

See also
2006 United States Senate elections
2006 United States elections

References

Notes

2006
Maryland
United States Senate